The Portugal women's national futsal team represents Portugal in international futsal competitions and is controlled by the Federação Portuguesa de Futebol.

Tournament records

World Tournament

UEFA European Championship

Current squad 

Squad for the 2019 UEFA Euro as of 16 February.

Friendlies

2018

2019

References

See also 

 Futsal in Portugal
 Portugal women's national football team

European women's national futsal teams
F
Nat